The 2019 Middle Tennessee Blue Raiders football team represented Middle Tennessee State University as a member of the East Division of Conference USA (C-USA) during the 2019 NCAA Division I FBS football season. Led by 14th-year head coach Rick Stockstill, the Blue Raiders compiled an overall record of 4–8 with a mark of 3–5 in conference play, tying for fifth place in the C-USA's East Division. The team played home games at Johnny "Red" Floyd Stadium in Murfreesboro, Tennessee.

Preseason

CUSA media poll
Conference USA released their preseason media poll on July 16, 2019, with the Blue Raiders predicted to finish in fourth place in the East Division.

Preseason All-CUSA teams
To be released

Schedule
Middle Tennessee announced its 2019 football schedule on January 10, 2019. The 2019 schedule consisted of six home and six away games.

Game summaries

at Michigan

Tennessee State

Duke

at Iowa

Marshall

at Florida Atlantic

at North Texas

FIU

at Charlotte

Rice

Old Dominion

at Western Kentucky

References

Middle Tennessee
Middle Tennessee Blue Raiders football seasons
Middle Tennessee Blue Raiders football